Count Reinhard IV of Hanau-Münzenberg (14 March 1473 – 30 January 1512) succeeded in 1500 his father Philipp I of Hanau-Münzenberg (1449–1500) in the government of the County of Hanau-Münzenberg. He served as co-regent from 1496 onwards.

Youth 
Reinhard IV was born the son of Philipp I, Count of Hanau-Münzenberg and his wife, Countess Adriana of Nassau-Siegen (1449–1477).  His godfather was Prince-abbot Johann II of Henneberg-Schleusingen of the Fulda monastery.

Reinhard IV made several journeys in his youth: in 1493 to the Palatine court at Heidelberg and in 1495 to the Diet of Worms.

Government 
From 1496 to 1500, Reinhard IV acted as co-ruler alongside his father who was already disabled by old age.

He was the first count to use the name Hanau-Münzenberg, to distinguish his line from his relatives in Hanau-Lichtenberg. The two lines had existed since the county was divided between Philipp the Elder and Philipp the Younger in 1458. Reinhard also added the arms of the Lordship of Münzenberg to his coat of arms.

In 1500, Reinhard exchanged some territories with the County of Isenburg, giving them Offenbach am Main and his share of Bracht and received the village of Bischofsheim (now part of Maintal) in return, thereby ending a protracted conflict between the two neighboring rulers. In 1503, he exchanged half the village of Trais (now part of Münzenberg) for the share in Seckbach held by the Counts of Solms. In 1504, he purchased the other shares in Seckbach from their respective owners: the Schelme von Bergen family, the Farchen of Heidelberg family and the Glauburg family in Frankfurt.

The County of Hanau-Münzenberg suffered badly during the Landshut War of Succession in 1504, from the Hessian troops passing through the county and from the Hessian occupation of Bad Homburg, which Hanau had purchased in 1487 for 19,000 guilders. This issue was mediated by Emperor Charles V at the Diet of Worms in 1521. Hesse was allowed to keep Homburg, but had to reimburse Hanau with 000 guilders.

In 1505, Emperor Maximilian I appointed Reinhard IV as his councillor.

Reinhard IV was involved in several other disputes about his rights and his policies. His most prominent opponent may have been Götz von Berlichingen, who raided a convoy in the Kinzig valley which was protected by Reinhard's troops. The Lords of Hutten joined the resulting controversy, claiming the raid had happened on their territory.

Marriage and issue 
 
Reinhard IV married on 13 February 1496 with Katharina of Schwarzburg-Blankenburg (after 1470 – 27 November 1514). She received as dowry 4000 florins plus the Schwarzburg share of the mortgage of the imperial city of Gelnhausen.

Reinhard IV and Katharina had four children:
 Anna (born: 22 May 1498 – died in the same year)
 Berthold (born: 12 July 1499 – died: 27 April 1504), buried in the choir of St. Mary's Church in Hanau
 Philipp II (1501–1529)
 Balthasar (1508–1534)

Death 
Reinhard IV died on 30 January 1512 and was buried in the choir of St. Mary's Church in Hanau.

Ancestors

References 
 Reinhard Dietrich: Die Landesverfassung in dem Hanauischen, in: Hanauer Geschichtsblätter, vol. 34, Hanau, 1996, 
 B. Picard: Die Herren von Eppstein und Homburg, in: Bad Homburg v.d.H. 782-1982, Homburg, 1983, p. 111-132 (127 ff)
 Reinhard Suchier: Genealogie des Hanauer Grafenhauses, in: Festschrift des Hanauer Geschichtsvereins zu seiner fünfzigjährigen Jubelfeier am 27. August 1894, Hanau, 1894
 Helmgard Ulmschneider: Götz von Berlichingen. Mein Fehd und Handlungen = Forschungen aus Württembergisch Franken, vol. 17, Sigmaringen, 1981, 
 Ernst J. Zimmermann: Hanau Stadt und Land, 3rd ed., Hanau, 1919, reprinted 1978

Footnotes 

Counts of Hanau-Münzenberg
1473 births
1512 deaths
15th-century German people
16th-century German people